Rodrigo Bruni (born 3 September 1993) is an Argentine rugby union player who plays for the national Argentina team The Pumas.

Bruni was a starter for the  national team on 14 November 2020 in their first ever win against the All Blacks. He joined French side Vannes for the 2020–21 season.

References

External links
 

Jaguares (Super Rugby) players
Rugby union number eights
Argentine rugby union players
1993 births
Living people
Club San Luis players
Argentina international rugby union players
Rugby Club Vannes players